Farley was a closed station on the Main North railway line in New South Wales.  It opened in 1860 initially as Wollombi Road, and closed to passenger services in 1975. It was a side platform with a substantial station building which lay disused until eventual demolition. Only the platform face remains. Save our Rails, a Newcastle rail lobby group, has suggested opening a new railway station in the Farley area to improve rail access to Newcastle.

References 

Disused regional railway stations in New South Wales
Railway stations in the Hunter Region
Maitland, New South Wales
Railway stations in Australia opened in 1860
Railway stations closed in 1975